Schweinfurthberget is a mountain in Barentsøya, Svalbard. It has a height of 590 m.a.s.l., and is the highest mountain of Barentsøya. The mountain is named after German scientist Georg August Schweinfurth.

References

Mountains of Svalbard
Barentsøya